Buckinghamshire is a former United Kingdom Parliamentary constituency. It was a constituency of the House of Commons of the Parliament of England then of the Parliament of Great Britain from 1707 to 1800 and of the Parliament of the United Kingdom from 1801 to 1885.

Its most prominent member was Prime Minister Benjamin Disraeli.

Boundaries and boundary changes
This county constituency consisted of the historic county of Buckinghamshire, in south-eastern England to the north-west of the modern Greater London region. Its southern boundary was the River Thames. See History of Buckinghamshire for maps of the historic county and details about it.

The county returned two knights of the shire until 1832 and three 1832–1885. The place of election for the county was at the county town of Aylesbury. Aylesbury replaced Buckingham as the county town in 1529.

The county, up to 1885, also contained the borough constituencies of Amersham (originally enfranchised with 2 seats from 1300, revived 1625, disenfranchised 1832), Aylesbury (originally enfranchised with 2 seats from 1302, revived 1554), Buckingham (2 seats from 1529, 1 seat from 1868), Chipping Wycombe (2 seats from 1300, 1 seat from 1868), Great Marlow (2 seats 1625–1868, 1 seat from 1868) and Wendover (2 seats 1625–1832, disenfranchised 1832).

In 1885 the county was split into three single-member county divisions. These were Aylesbury, Buckingham and Wycombe.

Aylesbury, Buckingham, Chipping Wycombe and Great Marlow were disenfranchised as borough constituencies. There were no remaining Parliamentary boroughs in the county from 1885.

Members of Parliament
Preliminary note: The English civil year started on 25 March until 1752 (Scotland having changed to 1 January in 1600). The year used in the lists of Parliaments in this article have been converted to the new style where necessary. Old style dates would be a year earlier than the new style for days between 1 January and 24 March. No attempt has been made to compensate for the eleven days which did not occur in September 1752 in both England and Scotland as well as other British controlled territories (when the day after 2 September was 14 September), so as to bring the British Empire fully in line with the Gregorian calendar.

Constituency created (1265): See Simon de Montfort's Parliament for further details. Knights of the shire are known to have been summoned to most Parliaments from 1290 (19th Parliament of King Edward I of England) and to every one from 1320 (19th Parliament of King Edward II of England).

Knights of the shire 1290–1660

Knights of the shire 1660–1832

Knights of the shire 1832–1885

Elections
In multi-member elections the bloc voting system was used. Voters could cast a vote for one or two (or three in three-member elections 1832–1868) candidates, as they chose. The leading candidates with the largest number of votes were elected. In 1868 the limited vote was introduced, which restricted an individual elector to using one or two votes, in elections to fill three seats.

In by-elections, to fill a single seat, the first past the post system applied.

After 1832, when registration of voters was introduced, a turnout figure is given for contested elections. In three-member elections, when the exact number of participating voters is unknown, this is calculated by dividing the number of votes by three (to 1868) and two thereafter. To the extent that electors did not use all their votes this will be an underestimate of turnout.

Where a party had more than one candidate in one or both of a pair of successive elections change is calculated for each individual candidate, otherwise change is based on the party vote.

Candidates for whom no party has been identified are classified as Non Partisan. The candidate might have been associated with a party or faction in Parliament or consider himself to belong to a particular political tradition. Political parties before the 19th century were not as cohesive or organised as they later became. Contemporary commentators (even the reputed leaders of parties or factions) in the 18th century did not necessarily agree who the party supporters were. The traditional parties, which had arisen in the late 17th century, became increasingly irrelevant to politics in the 18th century (particularly after 1760), although for some contests in some constituencies party labels were still used. It was only towards the end of the century that party labels began to acquire some meaning again, although this process was by no means complete for several more generations.'

Sources: The results for elections 1660-1790 were taken from the History of Parliament Trust publications. The results are based on Stooks Smith from 1790 until the 1832 United Kingdom general election and Craig from 1832. Where Stooks Smith gives additional information after 1832 this is indicated in a note.

Elections in the 1660-70s

 Appointment of Tyrrell as a Judge

Elections in the 1680-90s

 Succession of Wharton as 5th Baron Wharton

 Note (February 1696): The William Cheyne succeeded his father as the 2nd Viscount Newhaven, an Irish peerage, in 1698.
 Death of Atkins

Elections in the 1700-10s

 Death of Wharton

 Appointment of Dormer as a Justice of the Court of Common Pleas

 Note (1708): Possible classification - Hampden (W)

 Note (1713): Possible classification - Fleetwood (T)

 Note (1715): Possible classification - Fleetwood (T), Hampden (W)
 Appointment of Hampden as a Teller of the Exchequer

 Note (1716): Possible classification - Hampden (W)
 Appointment of Hampden as Treasurer of the Navy

 Note (1717): Possible classification - Hampden (W)

Elections in the 1720-30s

 Note (1722): Possible classification - Drake (T), Lee & Dormer (W)

 Note (1727): Possible classification - Stanhope & Hampden (W), Gore (T)
 Death of Hampden

 Note (1729): Possible classification - Lee (W)

 Note (1734): Possible classification - Stanhope & Lee (W), Lowndes (T)

Elections in the 1740-50s

 Note (1741): Possible classification - Lowndes (T)

 Note (1747): Possible classification - Lowndes (T), Stanhope (W)

 Note (1754): Possible classification - Lowndes (T), Stanhope (W)

Elections in the 1760-70s

 Note (1761): Possible classification - Lowndes (T), Stanhope (W)

 Note (1768): Possible classification - Lowndes (T)

 Succession of Grenville as 3rd Earl Temple

Elections in the 1780-90s

 Note (1784): Poll 13 days. 3,548 voted. Possible classification for Aubrey (T). (Source: Stooks Smith)
 An alternative interpretation is that Aubrey was a supporter of Pitt (who called himself a Whig, although retrospectively usually classified as a Tory). Aubrey had very clearly identified himself with the opposition to the Fox-North coalition. (Source: Davis)
 Appointment of Grenville as Secretary of State for the Home Department

 Death of Verney

 Resignation of Grenville

Elections in the 1800-10s

 Note (1802): Identifying a definitive party label for Temple and Titchfield is difficult. Stooks Smith considered Temple a Tory and Titchfield a Whig, but he may not be reliable for Bucks candidates allegiances before about 1818. Both knights of the shire were members of traditional Whig families and were closely related to one or more Whig Prime Ministers. Temple was a member of the Grenville family, which had supported their cousin William Pitt the Younger during his first premiership 1783-1801. Former Bucks MP (and uncle of Earl Temple) William Grenville, 1st Baron Grenville had become closer to Charles James Fox and his faction of opposition Whigs since leaving office with Pitt in 1801. This may have affected the political position of his relatives like Earl Temple. Titchfield was the son of William Cavendish-Bentinck, 3rd Duke of Portland who had been the Whig Prime Minister of the Fox-North Coalition, in office before Pitt. However Portland had split his Whig faction and broken with the pre-eminent opposition Whig leader in the House of Commons, Charles James Fox, over the attitude to be taken to the French Revolution. Portland joined Pitt's cabinet in 1794. Pitt called himself a Whig, although his followers came from both traditional Whig and Tory families. Titchfield, when he was first elected for the county in 1791, had been brought forward as a candidate by the Buckinghamshire Independent Club. This club had supported the late Earl Verney, and were definitely a Whig organisation. At that time Titchfield's father was the leader of the largest Whig faction in opposition to Pitt's Ministry. However Davis does imply that Titchfield himself was a Tory, which is how he has been classified in this article. In the absence of a clear indication of whether Temple considered himself a Whig or Tory at this stage of his career, he has been classified as a Non Partisan member for this article.

 Note (1806): As for 1802 save that following Pitt's death William Wyndham Grenville, 1st Baron Grenville, who had not joined Pitt's second Ministry in 1804, become Prime Minister of the Ministry of All the Talents in 1806. This may have led the Grenvilles, in retrospect, to continue to be regarded as Whig when Pitt and other groups of his supporters came to be called Tory after Pitt's death.

 Note (1807): As before save that in 1807 the Duke of Portland had formed a Tory administration (although he claimed to be the Whig Prime Minister of a Tory Ministry). In retrospect Portland has been regarded as a Tory at the time of his second Ministry.
 Succession of Titchfield as 4th Duke of Portland

 Note (1810): Possible party for Selby Lowndes is Whig (source: Stooks Smith), but given his conservative religious views and support for Henry Addington, 1st Viscount Sidmouth's anti-dissenter policy it may be best to regard him as a member of a traditional Whig family who was moving towards being a nineteenth century Tory. He has been classified as Non Partisan for the purpose of this article.

 Succession of Temple as 2nd Marquess of Buckingham

 Note (1813): Grenville was the uncle of the 2nd Marquess of Buckingham (formerly Earl Temple MP). The same factors noted for Temple lead to Thomas Grenville being classified as Non Partisan for the purpose of this article. Stooks Smith however classifies him as Tory and he was of the same generation as his brother William Grenville, 1st Baron Grenville classified by Stooks Smith as a Tory and in this article as a Whig.

Elections in the 1820-30s

 From 1822 Temple was known by the courtesy title of Marquess of Chandos, as his father was created 1st Duke of Buckingham and Chandos

 Note (1831): Chandos 1,287 plumpers, 287 split with Smith, 18 split with Grenfell; Smith 191 plumpers, 806 split with Grenfell; Grenfell 2 plumpers. Total voters 2,593. (Source: Davis). Poll: 4 days.

 Death of Praed

 Succession of Chandos as 2nd Duke of Buckingham and Chandos

Elections in the 1840-50s

 Death of Young

 Resignation of Scott-Murray by accepting the office of Steward of the Manor of Hempholme

 Appointment of Disraeli as Chancellor of the Exchequer

 

 Creation of Cavendish as 1st Baron Chesham

 Appointment of Disraeli as Chancellor of the Exchequer

Elections in the 1860-80s
 Succession of Cavendish as 2nd Baron Chesham

 Appointment of Disraeli as Chancellor of the Exchequer

 

 

 Talley was a Slough solicitor who contested the seat as a "Progressive Conservative". (Source: Davis)
 Appointment of Disraeli as Prime Minister and First Lord of the Treasury

 Creation of Disraeli as 1st Earl of Beaconsfield

 

 Constituency divided in the 1885 redistribution

See also
 List of former United Kingdom Parliament constituencies
 Unreformed House of Commons
 List of parliaments of England

References

 The History and Antiquities of Buckinghamshire, Vol. 1, by George Lipscomb (1847)
 The House of Commons 1754-1790, by Sir Lewis Namier and John Brooke (HMSO 1964)
 Political Change and Continuity 1760-1885: A Buckinghamshire Study, by Richard W. Davis (David & Charles 1972)
 The Parliaments of England by Henry Stooks Smith (1st edition published in three volumes 1844-50), second edition edited (in one volume) by F. W. S. Craig (Political Reference Publications 1973)
 Who's Who of British Members of Parliament: Volume I 1832-1885, edited by M. Stenton (The Harvester Press 1976)
 British Parliamentary Election Results 1832-1885, compiled and edited by F. W. S. Craig (The Macmillan Press 1977)
 

Parliamentary constituencies in Buckinghamshire (historic)
Constituencies of the Parliament of the United Kingdom established in 1265
Constituencies of the Parliament of the United Kingdom disestablished in 1885
Constituencies of the Parliament of the United Kingdom represented by a sitting Prime Minister